Culture park, in Poland, is a designation in the heritage register for cultural landscape-level objects of cultural heritage in Poland.

, the National Heritage Board of Poland listed 38 culture parks. (The list is indecisive, because local communes have no obligation to report the establishment of cultural parks.)

References

Objects of cultural heritage in Poland
Law of Poland
Parks in Poland